The Moelwynion (a Welsh plural, sometimes anglicised to Moelwyns) are a group of mountains in central Snowdonia. They extend from the north-east of Porthmadog to Moel Siabod, the highest of the group. The name derives from the names of two of the largest mountains in the group, Moelwyn Mawr (great white hill) and Moelwyn Bach (little white hill), 770m and 710m, respectively. Moel Siabod, to the north, is the highest at 872m.

The group includes the following summits:

Moel Siabod  	
Moelwyn Mawr 	
Moelwyn Bach 	
Allt-fawr 	
Cnicht 	
Craigysgafn 	
Cnicht North Top 	
Moel Druman 	
Ysgafell Wen 	
Ysgafell Wen North Top 	
Manod Mawr 	
Manod Mawr North Top 	
Ysgafell Wen Far North Top 	
Moel-yr-hydd 	
Moelwyn Mawr North Ridge Top 	
Moel Penamnen 	
Moel Meirch
Y Ro Wen

External links
 Walking Routes in the Moelwynion

Beddgelert
Bro Machno
Capel Curig
Dolwyddelan
Ffestiniog
Llanfrothen
Mountains and hills of Conwy County Borough
Mountains and hills of Gwynedd
Mountains and hills of Snowdonia